Emily B. Lazar is an American mastering engineer. She is the founder, president, and chief mastering engineer of The Lodge, an audio mastering facility that has operated in New York City's Greenwich Village since 1997. She won a Grammy Award for Best Engineered Album, Non-Classical for Beck's album Colors, becoming the first female mastering engineer to win in this category.

Early life and education
Lazar was born and raised in New York. She earned a Bachelor of Arts Degree in Creative Writing and Music from Skidmore College, graduating cum laude with honors distinction in her major. During college, she wrote music, played in bands, and worked as a freelance engineer, producer and mixer. After college, Lazar worked in some of New York City's most prominent studios. Later she earned a Master of Music Degree from New York University's prestigious Music Technology program. While there, she pursued Tonmeister studies and was awarded a Graduate Fellowship.  Lazar's thesis on Sonic Solutions, combined with an internship at Sony Classical, eventually led to a position at New York City based mastering facility, Masterdisk.

Career
Lazar has worked on over 3,000 albums with such artists as Panic! At The Disco, Sia, Coldplay, Destiny's Child, David Bowie, Foo Fighters, The Prodigy, The Killers, Morrissey, Linkin Park, Vampire Weekend, Maggie Rogers, Depeche Mode, Dolly Parton, Angel Olsen, The Walkmen, Donald Fagen, Sky Ferreira, Alanis Morissette, Tiësto, The Shins, Lou Reed, Chainsmokers, Barbra Streisand, HAIM, The Raveonettes, Björk, Broken Social Scene, Cults, Boy & Bear, Goldfrapp, Moby, Paul McCartney, The Naked and Famous, Garbage, Sonic Youth, Nada Surf, Sinéad O'Connor, Rza, Wu-Tang Clan, Tegan and Sara, Sleigh Bells, Fucked Up, Chromeo, The Raveonettes, The Subways, Thievery Corporation, Death Cab for Cutie, Heffron Drive, BT, The Velvet Underground, Morgan Page, Armin Van Buuren, Jedi Mind Tricks, John Mayer, Anti-Flag, Third Eye Blind, Shiny Toy Guns, The Donnas, The All American Rejects, Vanessa Carlton, Jacob Collier and many more.

Current articles on Emily Lazar include features in NPR, Artist Pro (cover story), Bust, Electronic Musician (cover story), Home Recording Magazine, Mix Magazine, Billboard Magazine, Pro Sound News, Medialine, Remix Magazine, and Tape Op. She has been a featured panelist lecturing on college campuses and in numerous music business and recording conferences. Lazar has also been awarded the prestigious Palamountain Award for Young Alumni Achievement from Skidmore College and has served as adjunct faculty of New York University in the Music Technology Department. She is also a highly publicized product endorsee for Avalon Design (audio equipment), Apple Computers, Antelope Audio and Dangerous Music. Emily resides in New York and presently serves as a Trustee of the Recording Academy. She also serves on the NY Chapter's Board of Governors for the National Academy of Recording Arts and Sciences and previously Co-Chaired the NY Chapter's Producer & Engineer's Wing. Currently Lazar serves on the Recording Academy's P&E Wing National Steering Committee, P&E Wing National Advisory Council, and the Recording Academy's National Advocacy Committee.

In 2019, Lazar became the first female mastering engineer to win the Best Engineered Album (Non-Classical) Grammy, which she won for her work on Beck's Colors.

In 2021, Emily became the first mastering engineer to land 3 Grammy nods for Album of the Year.   Leading up to the Grammy Awards, Chris Martin from Coldplay admitted that their latest album could have sounded terrible if it wasn't for one person — mastering engineer Emily Lazar.

The Lodge
The Lodge, an audio mastering facility, opened in 1997 in Greenwich Village in downtown Manhattan.

We Are Moving The Needle
On March 8, 2021, Emily announced the launch of the We Are Moving The Needle foundation - aiming to create measurable change for women in the recording industry with the education, equipment and the mentorship needed to succeed.  Mentors for the program include Brandi Carlile, HAIM, Maggie Rogers and many others.

Awards, nominations and wins
Grammy Awards nominations and wins
2012 – Album of the Year for Wasting Light by Foo Fighters
2015 – Record of the Year for Chandelier by Sia
2016 – Best Engineered Album, Non-Classical for Recreational Love by The Bird and the Bee 
2019 –  (Win) Best Engineered Album (Non-Classical) for Colors by Beck
2020 – Album of the Year for Father of the Bride by Vampire Weekend
2021 – Album of the Year for Women in Music Pt. III by Haim
2021 – Album of the Year for Djesse Vol.3 by Jacob Collier
2021 – Album of the Year for Everyday Life by Coldplay

Latin Grammy Awards nominations and wins
2022 – Album of the Year for Deja by Bomba Estéreo

Pensado Awards
2014 – Lazar was nominated for the Master of Mastering - Mastering Engineers Award at the first annual Pensado Awards show.

TEC Awards
2012 – Lazar won the Technical Excellence & Creativity (TEC) Award in the "Record/Production Album" category for her work on Foo Fighters's Wasting Light.

2016 – Lazar won the Technical Excellence & Creativity (TEC) Award in the "Record/Production Single or Track" category for her work on Beck's "Dreams".

2019 – Lazar won the Technical Excellence & Creativity (TEC) Award in the "Record/Production Album" category for her work on Beck's Colors.

Billboard Magazine Women in Music: Hitmakers from Behind the Scenes
2015 – Lazar was featured in the December issue of Billboard's Women in Music: Hitmakers from Behind the Scenes "Fine-tuned ears are the trademarks of these four creators. Emily Lazar's golden ears are in high-demand. Just ask clients like Foo Fighters, Beck and Coldplay, whose new album A Head Full of Dreams, tops Lazar's discography."

ELLE Magazine The Women in Music Power List
2017 – Lazar was featured in the June issue of Elle's The Women in Music Power List highlighting 14 women as "the industry's most influential execs, producers and songwriters."

Variety Magazine Power of Women Impact List
2019 – Lazar was featured in the April issue of Variety's The Power of Women Impact List recognizing "women at the forefront of their fields."

Recent work

2010

2011

2012

2013

2014

2015

2016

2017

2018

2019

2020

2021

2022

References

American audio engineers
Living people
Women audio engineers
Grammy Award winners
Year of birth missing (living people)
American people of Lithuanian-Jewish descent